Smith is a 1917 British silent romance film directed by Maurice Elvey and starring Elisabeth Risdon, Fred Groves and Manora Thew. It was based on the 1909 play Smith  by Somerset Maugham.

Cast
 Elisabeth Risdon - Smith
 Fred Groves - Tom Freeman
 Manora Thew - Rose Baker
 Guy Newall - Algy Peppercorn
 Douglas Munro - Otto Rosenburg
 Lydia Bilbrook - Mrs. Rosenburg

References

External links

1917 films
British silent feature films
1910s romance films
1910s English-language films
Films directed by Maurice Elvey
British films based on plays
Films based on works by W. Somerset Maugham
British black-and-white films
British romance films
1910s British films